Portrait of a Knight of Malta is a c.1515 oil on canvas painting by Titian of a knight belonging to the Order of Malta. It is now in the Uffizi in Florence. The last bead of the rosary held by the knight bears the number XXXV (35), showing the subject's age at the time of the portrait. W.F. Dickes. argued that he was Stefano Colonna, the condottiero who led the republican resistance during the siege of Florence. cited in 

Thanks to Paolo del Sera, his agent in Venice, cardinal Leopoldo de' Medici acquired several works by the Venetian school for his collection, which later became part of the Uffizi. Portrait was one of these works, costing 300 piastres, showing it was already considered to be an autograph work. It was exhibited in the Tribuna in 1677 and attributed to Giorgione in 1709, as shown on a label on the back of the painting. It was then moved to the villa di Poggio a Caiano. After several subsequent moves, in 1798 it finally arrived back Uffizi.

Oxidisation in the paint in the 19th century made attribution difficult. Joseph Archer Crowe, Cavalcaselle and Giovanni Morelli could not decide on the work's artist, Otto Mündler (1869) argued it was by Pietro della Vecchia and Roberto Longhi that it was by Paris Bordone - other critics shifted between Giorgione and Titian as the artist. Stefano Scarpelli restored it in 1998, enabling it to be identified as an early Titian still with heavy influences from Giorgione.

Bibliography 
 Francesco Valcanover, L'opera completa di Tiziano, Rizzoli, Milano 1969.
 Gloria Fossi, Uffizi, Giunti, Firenze 2004.

References

External links

Knight of Malta
Paintings in the collection of the Uffizi
1515 paintings
Knight of Malta
Knight of Malta
Knights of Malta